Layla Ahmadi (born 1964) is an Afghani media professional and politician. She was a member of the Afghan Senate before the fall of Kabul.

Early life
She was born in 1964 in Kabul and was raised there in a family originally from the state of Panjshir. She studied media at the Kabul Technical Institute and graduated in 1981, then continued her studies after 2002 until she obtained a Bachelor of Political Science in 2014.
Since 1981, she has worked as artistic director, journalist, broadcaster, programmer, director of radio and television programmes, first editor-in-chief of Women's Day magazine, employee of the Presidential Press Office, member of the Afghanistan Council for Peaceful Consultations and member of the traditional Loya Jirga . She was nicknamed "Shaista" (decent) in her media career. She was appointed as a member of the Afghan Senate and worked in the relevant bodies and as the deputy of the Education, Culture, Higher Education and Scientific Research Committee.

References

1964 births
Living people
Afghan women activists